The 1989–90 FA Trophy was the twenty-first season of the FA Trophy.

First qualifying round

Ties

Replays

2nd replay

Second qualifying round

Ties

Replays

2nd replay

Third qualifying round

Ties

Replays

2nd replay

1st round
The teams that given byes to this round are Telford United, Darlington, Kettering Town, Wycombe Wanderers, Boston United, Kidderminster Harriers, Barnet, Runcorn, Macclesfield Town, Yeovil Town, Northwich Victoria, Welling United, Cheltenham Town, Enfield, Sutton United, Altrincham, Fisher Athletic, Merthyr Tydfil, Barrow, Farnborough Town, Aylesbury United, Wealdstone, Dartford, Burton Albion, Hyde United, Wokingham Town, Newcastle Blue Star, Bishop Auckland, Redbridge Forest, Windsor and Eton, Billingham Synthonia and Tow Law Town.

Ties

Replays

2nd replay

2nd round

Ties

Replays

3rd round

Ties

Replays

4th round

Ties

Replays

Semi finals

First leg

Second leg

Final

Tie

References

General
 Football Club History Database: FA Trophy 1989-90

Specific

1989–90 domestic association football cups
League
1989-90